Kenny Harrison (born Kerry Harrison, February 13, 1965 in Milwaukee, Wisconsin, United States) is a former track and field athlete competing in triple jump.

Athletic career

High school

Harrison went to Brookfield Central for high school, where he competed in football, basketball and track. He holds schools records in the long, high, and triple jump. His triple jump of 52 feet 4.5 inches at the 1983 Golden West Invitational ranked him #2 triple jump prep in the nation, and currently stands as the Wisconsin high school #1 all-time triple jump by over 2 feet. That mark also ranks on the top 10 list for the Golden West Invitational. He also had a personal best in the long jump of 23 feet 4 inches, which ranks among the top 35 in Wisconsin high school track & field history and a high jump of 6 feet 7 inches. He held the Wisconsin state meet triple jump record of  48' 6.25" for 22 years, from 1983 to 2005.

College
Harrison attended college at Kansas State University, where he captured three individual titles at the NCAA Championships, the most in school history. He was a 8-time Big 12 Conference individual champion in both  indoor and outdoor long and triple jump. He holds school records in indoor long jump (26' 9.75") and outdoor long and triple jump (26' 11.5" and 56'0", respectively).

Harrison is the first K-State Track and Field athlete to be inducted into the Kansas State University Athletic Hall of Fame. The former Wildcat letterman was an 11-time NCAA All-American during his time at Kansas State University from 1984-88. Competing primarily in jumps, Harrison won NCAA indoor titles in the long jump in 1986 and the triple jump in 1988. He also won the NCAA outdoor triple jump crown in 1986 as well as being a three-time runner up in the NCAA Championships. Along with numerous accolades on the national stage, Harrison was a 15-time Big 8 Champion and still holds as of 2015 the school records in the indoor and outdoor long jump and outdoor triple jump.

Olympics 
The 1991 World triple jump Champion, his chances of competing in the 1992 Olympics were ruined when he tore the cartilage in his knee. This jump is notable for the fact that it is the longest jump ever with a negative wind reading (the athlete with the next best is Jonathan Edwards with 17.79 meters). The jump ranks Harrison as the fourth best triple jumper in history, behind Jonathan Edwards (18.29WR), Christian Taylor (18.21), and Will Claye (18.14).

USATF
Harrison was inducted in the USATF Hall of Fame in 2013.

1998: best of 55-11.25...8th at Goodwill Games (54-2.75)...ranked #4 U.S. in TJ by T&FN.

1997: best of 57-5.5...won USA Champs (55-8.25)...9th at World Champs (55-11.25)...ranked #4 in world (#1 U.S.) at TJ by T&FN.

1996: best of 59-4.25...won Olympic Trials (59-1.25w)...gold at Olympic Games (59-4.25 AR)...ranked #2 in world (#1 U.S.) at TJ by T&FN.

1995: best of 55-11.25...won USA Indoor (55-9)...ranked #2 U.S. at TJ by T&FN.

1994: best of 57-2.25...2nd in USA Champs...ranked #2 in world (#2 U.S.) at TJ by T&FN.

1993: best of 56-8...2nd in USA Champs (56-8)...10th at World Champs (55-11.75)...ranked #2 U.S. at TJ by T&FN.

1992: best of 55-11.75...6th in Olympic Trials...surgery for torn cartilage in knee...ranked #4 U.S. at TJ by T&FN.

1991: best of 58-4...won USA Champs (56-10)...won gold at World Champs (58-4)...ranked #1 in world at TJ by T&FN.

1990: best of 58-10...won USA Indoor (55-0)...won USA Champs (56-3.25)...won Goodwill Games (58-1.25)...lost only once, in Zurich to Mike Conley...ranked #1 in world at TJ by T&FN.

1989: best of 57-3.75...6th in USA Indoor...ranked #4 in world (#2 U.S.) at TJ by T&FN.

1988: best of 56-3.25...won NCAA Indoor; 8th in LJ...2nd in NCAA LJ...6th in Olympic Trials...ranked #4 U.S. at TJ by T&FN; #9 U.S. at LJ.

1987: best of 56-0...3rd in NCAA Indoor LJ...2nd in NCAA...7th in USA Champs...2nd in World University Games...ranked #7 U.S. at TJ by T&FN.

1986: best of 56-0...won NCAA Indoor LJ...won NCAA (56-0); 6th in LJ...4th in USA Champs...ranked #4 U.S. at TJ by T&FN; #6 U.S. at LJ.

1985: best of 53-5.5...7th in NCAA Indoor; 5th in LJ.

1984: best of 54-1.75...11th in NCAA...22nd in qualifying at Olympic Trials...won USA Juniors...silver in Pan-Am Juniors.

1983: best of 52-4.5...2nd at Golden West (52-4.5).

1982: best of 48-8.5.

Competition Record

 SB - Season best
 PB - Personal best
 AR - American record
 OR - Olympic record

References

External links
 
 
 
 Wisconsin High School Track and Field bio for Kenny Harrison

1965 births
Living people
American male triple jumpers
Athletes (track and field) at the 1996 Summer Olympics
Olympic gold medalists for the United States in track and field
Track and field athletes from Milwaukee
World Athletics Championships medalists
Medalists at the 1996 Summer Olympics
Universiade medalists in athletics (track and field)
Goodwill Games medalists in athletics
Universiade silver medalists for the United States
World Athletics Championships winners
Medalists at the 1987 Summer Universiade
Competitors at the 1990 Goodwill Games
Competitors at the 1994 Goodwill Games